Rodrigo Ponce de Leon, Duke of Cádiz (1443–1492) was one of the Castilian military leaders in the conquest of Granada.  In 1482 he led the Castilian forces that captured the town of Alhama and later  Boabdil.  He had earlier been one of the military leaders in the Castilian War of Succession.  Juan Pacheco was his father-in-law.  He was made 1st Duke of Cádiz in 1484 and succeeded briefly by his heir Francisca Ponce de León y de la Fuente.

Ponce de León is also related to:

 Juan Ponce de León
 Juan Ponce de León II
 Juan Ponce de León y Loayza

Sources
Harold Livermore. A History of Spain. New York: Grove Press, 1958. p. 192.

1443 births
1492 deaths
People of the Reconquista